Robert Thompson  (1839–1918) was a Member of Parliament from Ireland.  He represented Belfast North from January 1910 until 1918. Educated at Wellington Academy, Belfast, he later worked for Lindsay & Co. Ltd. eventually taking over and running the renamed Lindsay, Thompson & Co. Ltd., flax spinners.  He was President of Ulster Flax Spinners' Association and President of the Board of Governors of Campbell College, Belfast. He also was Chairman of Belfast Harbour Commissioners and he often travelled abroad with Lord Pirrie of Harland & Wolff and Bruce Ismay of the White Star Line. His name is remembered at Thompson Dry Dock (Now known as Titanic's Dock and Pump House).

He lived at Bertha House, 71 Malone Road, Belfast (demolished late 1990s) and at Drum House, Drumbeg, County Down.  Thompson's son, Samuel Hall-Thompson and grandson, Lloyd Hall-Thompson, also served as MPs.

Thompson died in 1918 and is buried in Belfast City Cemetery.

References

External links 
 

1839 births
1918 deaths
Politicians from Belfast
Members of the Parliament of the United Kingdom for Belfast constituencies (1801–1922)
UK MPs 1910
UK MPs 1910–1918
Businesspeople in textiles
Burials at Belfast City Cemetery
19th-century Irish businesspeople